Ghana–Malaysia relations refers to bilateral foreign relations between Ghana and Malaysia. Ghana has a high commission in Kuala Lumpur, and Malaysia has a high commission in Accra. Both countries are members of the Commonwealth of Nations and the Group of 77.

History 

Both the Federation of Malaya (now Malaysia) and Ghana achieved independence in 1957 and were once part of the British Empire, but the developmental difference between the two countries indicates a difference in policies as has been viewed by several Ghanaian researchers.

Economic relations 
Several documents have been signed by both countries to boost economic co-operation such as the promotion and the protecting of investments. Some Ghanaian construction professionals have visited Malaysia to learn more about regulations, health and safety, issuance of permits, planning practices, procurement and infrastructure development. A Ghana-Malaysia business council also has been launched to boost the economic opportunities in Ghana.

Further reading 
 Ghana-Malaysia: Two countries' contrasting tales Ghana Web
 Malaysian High Commission Donates To School Government of Ghana

See also 
 Foreign relations of Ghana
 Foreign relations of Malaysia

References 

 
Malaysia
Ghana
Malaysia
Ghana